Chris Bates is an American jazz bassist.  He started studying upright bass in the 4th grade, and he attended the University of Wisconsin-Eau Claire. He studied with James Clute of the Minnesota Orchestra and jazz bassist Anthony Cox. Beyond his work with jazz, Bates performs in reggae, funk, country, folk and classical styles. He has performed with several notable musicians including Mose Allison, Lee Konitz, Joe Lovano, Steven Bernstein, Howard Levy,  Ira Sullivan, Eric Alexander, Tim Sparks and Dean Magraw. Bates was a member of the Motion Poets, formed in 1993, which "released three albums to wide critical acclaim."  He received a McKnight Composers Fellowship for his compositions in 1999 and has performed on over 30 albums.  Bates' first album as leader was released in 2012.

Discography

As leader
New Hope (Technecore, 2012) with Brandon Wozniak, Chris Thomson, Zack Lozier, JT Bates
Good Vibes Trio (Technecore, 2014) with Dave Hagedorn and Phil Hey

As sideman
With Atlantis Quartet
Again, Too Soon (2007)
Animal Progress (2009)
Lines in the Sand (2011) recorded live at the Artists' Quarter
Expansion (2013)
Hello Human (2018)
With Kelly Rossum
Line (612 Sides, 2006)
Family (612 Sides, 2008)
Blue Earth County (612 Sides 2016)
With Motion Poets
Truth And Consequence (IGMOD, 1995)
Standard of Living (IGMOD, 1997)
Cruisin' USA (1998) live recordings 1997-1998
Lose Your Mind and Come to Your Senses (IGMOD, 1999)
With others
Blue Skies - Peg Carrothers (Bridge Boy, 2001)
SolidLiquid - Dave Hagedorn (Artegra, 2003)
Live at the Dakota - Claudia Schmidt (Independent, 2006)
The Return of Slide Huxtable - Slide Huxtable (CDBY, 2007)
Leaving Kansas - Holly Long (Skim Milk Productions, 2008)
Chance, Love, Logic - Ellen Lease/Pat Moriarty Quintet (Innova, 2008)
Space Dust - Dean Magraw's Red Planet (GoneJazz, 2009)
Framework - Framework (GoneJazz, 2009)
Ephemeral Eon - Luke Redfield (Dream Song, 2010)
Charades - Matt Latterell (2010)
Queen of the Devil's Rodeo - Jezebel Jones & Her Wicked Ways (2011)
Deep Purple Dreams - Paula Lammers (Nightingale Jazz, 2011)
Mighty Bird - The Hope Tonic (2011)
Blue Door - Tony Hymas & The Bates Brothers (Nato, 2012) 
No October - Dave Olson (2012)
The Garden - Zacc Harris Group (Shifting Paradigm, 2012)
Pushing Chain - Pushing Chain (Kingswood, 2014)
Tall Tales - Dean Granros (Shifting Paradigm, 2015)
Icehouse and Elsewhere - Fall of the House of Usher (Ecstatomatic, 2015)
Awakenings - Trent Baarspul (2016)
Welcome to the Valley - Leisure Valley (BDThorntunes, 2016)
Inventions & Dimensions - Wabi Sabi (Technecore, 2016)
Big Alpaca - Bill Simenson Orchestra (2017)
Red Planet with Bill Carrothers - Red Planet w/ Bill Carrothers (Shifting Paradigm, 2017)
Mysterious Thelonious - Laura Caviani Trio (2017)
Confluence - Laura Caviani Trio (2017)

References

Living people
American double-bassists
Male double-bassists
American jazz musicians
University of Wisconsin–Eau Claire alumni
Musicians from Wisconsin
Jazz musicians from Minnesota
21st-century double-bassists
21st-century American male musicians
American male jazz musicians
Year of birth missing (living people)
Mingus Big Band members